Guy Deutscher is a professor emeritus of physics at Tel Aviv University, Israel.  His area of research is experimental solid-state physics and superconductivity.
He completed his dissertation under the direction of the theoretical physicist Pierre Gilles de Gennes at the University of Paris-Sud in 1967 as a member of "the Orsay group on superconductivity".

Selected publications
New Superconductors: From Granular to High Tc, World Scientific Publishing Co Pte Ltd (2002), .
The Entropy Crisis, World Scientific Publishing Co Pte Ltd (2008), .
Entropy and Sustainable Growth, World Scientific Publishing Co Pte Ltd (2018), .

References

External links
 Guy Deutscher's home page at The Raymond and Beverly Sackler School of Physics and Astronomy, Tel Aviv University.
 Superconductivity group at The Raymond and Beverly Sackler School of Physics and Astronomy, Tel Aviv University.

Israeli physicists
Israeli Jews
Living people
Jewish physicists
Year of birth missing (living people)